The 2023 Indonesian Basketball League (or IBL Tokopedia for sponsorship reasons) was the eighth season since the re-branding by Starting5. This season is marked as 20th Anniversary of IBL indonesia since its establishment in the year of 2003 from previous competition KOBATAMA. From 2023, the divisions were abolished and therefore, each team has two matches against each other with total 30 games per team (240 season games in 8 cities). The playoff teams will be selected from top 8 and the format is home and away. The preseason IBL Indonesia cup (4 to 13 November 2022) returned after three year hiatus and Pelita Jaya Bakrie won the cup beating Satria Muda Pertamina.

Schedule and location

Homebase

Teams 
The same 16 teams from 2022.

Name changes

Personnel and Kits

Drafts

Foreign players

Rookie

1st round

2nd round

Recommended round

Preseason (IBL Indonesia Cup 2022)
All games were held in Sritex Arena, Solo from 4 November to 13 November 2022. Only local players participated during this preseason.

Preliminary round 
All times are local (UTC+7).

Group A

Group B

Group C

Group D

Finals round

Individual awards

Regular season

Results

Playoffs

Bracket

Statistics

Individual game highs

Individual statistic

Individual awards 
Most Valuable Player : 
Foreign Player of the Year : 

Rookie of the Year : 
Coach of the Year : 
Defensive Player of the Year : 
Sixthman of the Year : 
Most Improve Player of the Year : 
Best Referee of the Year :

All-Star Games

Pre-game 
Skill-challenge champion : 
Three-point contest champion :

Half game 
Slam-dunk contest champion :

Game

Most Valuable Player

Local Best Performer

Finals

Finals MVP

References

External links 
 Official Website

Basketball in Indonesia